Walter Dröscher is a physicist who worked at the Austrian Patent office (Österreichisches Patentamt). Now in retirement, he devotes most of his time to developing Heim Theory. It was in 1980 that Dröscher was introduced to the reclusive German physicist Burkhard Heim, thereby becoming one of the few physicists to collaborate with Heim.

Research 
Dröscher quickly familiarised himself with the theory and so was able to ensure that Volume II of Heim's work on elementary particle physics was essentially error free. Volume I contained errors that were only later corrected, with the help of Dröscher and others.

As he got to know the theory better, he saw that by re-introducing the 7th and 8th dimensions discarded from what had become Heim's 6-dimensional theory, two new forces could be derived which are related to normal gravity.

Dröscher also made clear the correspondence between Heim Theory and the Standard Model. In particular, the purported ability to accurately calculate the masses of atomic particles.

Awards 
In 2005, a team consisting of Dröscher and Jochem Häuser (University of Applied Sciences in Salzgitter, Germany; Physicist & Professor of Computer Science) received one of the 21 Best Paper awards that year  from the AIAA for their application of Heim-Dröscher theory to space propulsion. It is also noteworthy, that this particular award was delivered by the subcommittee of which Häuser was a member. Since 1998 Häuser is senior member of the AIAA, in 2004 he was elected member of the working group Nuclear and Future Flight Propulsion.

Criticism 
The Heim-Dröscher theory is not to be confused with such metrics as Alcubierre drive. And like other Faster Than Light theories, it is not without its critics.

References

External links 
Volume I, Heim, Elementarstrukturen der Materie: Einheitliche strukturelle Quantenfeldtheorie der Materie und Gravitation  (Elementary Structure of Matter: Enhanced Quantum Field Theory of Matter and Gravity)
Volume II 
Strukturen der physikalischen Welt und ihrer nichtmateriellen Seite, Heim, Physical Structures of the World and its Non-material Side
Jochem Häuser, Fachhochschule Braunschweig/Wolfenbüttel, University of Applied Sciences
High Performance Computing and Communication for Space (HPCC), Jochem Häuser is a member
Various papers, including both Dröscher and Häuser, HPCC
 Walter Dröscher@ Astrophysics Data System.

Living people
Year of birth missing (living people)
Austrian physicists